Nizhny Chat (Tübänge Sat) is a rural locality (a village) in Mesyagutovsky Selsoviet, Yanaulsky District, Bashkortostan, Russia. The population was 219 as of 2010. There are 4 streets.

Geography 
Nizhny Chat is located 44 km southeast of Yanaul (the district's administrative centre) by road. Verkhny Chat is the nearest rural locality.

References 

Rural localities in Yanaulsky District